Evenden is a surname. Notable people with the surname include:

Charles Evenden (1894–1961), British cartoonist and author
Don Evenden (1931–2018), Australian rugby league footballer
Reg Evenden (1919–1981), Australian rules footballer

See also
Evensen